The third Kretschmann cabinet is the current state government of Baden-Württemberg, sworn in on 12 May 2021 after Winfried Kretschmann was elected as Minister-President of Baden-Württemberg by the members of the Landtag of Baden-Württemberg. It is the 25th Cabinet of Baden-Württemberg.

It was formed after the 2021 Baden-Württemberg state election by Alliance 90/The Greens (GRÜNE) and the Christian Democratic Union (CDU). Excluding the Minister-President, the cabinet comprises twelve ministers. Six are members of the Greens, five are members of the CDU, and one is an independent politician.

Formation 

The previous cabinet was a coalition government of the Greens and CDU led by Minister-President Winfried Kretschmann of the Greens.

The election took place on 14 March 2021, and resulted in an improvement for the Greens and losses for the CDU. The opposition SPD saw a small decline while the FDP improved, and the AfD took significant losses, falling from third to fifth place. Overall, the governing coalition was returned with an increased majority.

Minister-President Kretschmann invited all parties except the AfD to exploratory talks, beginning with the CDU. On 2 April, the Greens voted to enter negotiations to renew the coalition with the CDU. The two parties presented their coalition pact on 1 May.

Kretschmann was re-elected as Minister-President by the Landtag on 12 May, winning 95 votes out of 152 cast.

Composition

External links

References 

Cabinets of Baden-Württemberg
State governments of Germany
Cabinets established in 2021
2021 establishments in Germany